USS Nashville (LPD-13), an , was the third ship of the United States Navy to be named for the capital city of Tennessee. Her keel was laid down on 14 March 1966 by the Lockheed Shipbuilding and Construction Company of Seattle, Washington. She was launched on 7 October 1967 sponsored by Mrs. Roy L. Johnson, and commissioned at Puget Sound Naval Shipyard, Bremerton, Washington, on 14 February 1970.

History
Nashville various assignments have included four Caribbean Amphibious Ready Groups, eight Mediterranean Groups, two Persian Gulf Groups, a Mine Countermeasure Task Group, North Atlantic Treaty Organization Operations and training assignments with Fleet Marine Force Atlantic.

The ship remained in Amphibious Squadron 2 in 1977. She served as squadron flagship from 1 January through 11 March; 29 April through 21 May; and 10 August through 31 December 1977. In addition, she served as flagship for Commander Combined Amphibious Task Force (Commander Task Force 401), Commander Combined Landing Force, and Commander Task Force 61 (Commander Amphibious Squadron 2) during NATO Exercise Dawn Patrol '77.

Nashville provided support during 8 June 1995 rescue of pilot Capt. Scott O'Grady, who was shot down over Bosnia on 2 June 1995 by an SA-6 mobile launcher and forced to eject from his F-16C into hostile territory.

In 2003, she deployed as part of the Iwo Jima Amphibious Ready Group with the 26th Marine Expeditionary Unit.

On 16 and 17 January 2006, she was the first vessel to receive the landing of an unmanned robotic RQ-8A Fire Scout helicopter.

In July 2006, she was sent to Lebanon as part of the  Expeditionary Strike Group transporting the 24th MEU to assist with the evacuation of U.S. nationals from the country, after a conflict erupted between the Israeli military and Hezbollah militants. On 20 July 2006, it landed the first Marines on Lebanese soil since 1982. The Nashville is featured in an episode of the television program Anthony Bourdain: No Reservations, as it evacuated Americans (including Bourdain and his production crew) from Beirut. The episode was nominated for an Emmy Award.

The USS Nashville was decommissioned on 30 September 2009 at the Norfolk Naval Station in Norfolk, Virginia. Navy officials stated the ship was too costly to maintain and was unable to match the efficiency of newer vessels. , the vessel is moored at the Naval Inactive Ship Maintenance Facility in Philadelphia, Pennsylvania.

Possible sale to India
According to an Indian news source, the Indian Navy may bid to acquire the Nashville, but , India had decided not to move forward with the deal.

Gallery

References

External links

 USS Nashville at Navy.mil
 USS Nashville command history at the Naval History & Heritage Command

Austin-class amphibious transport docks
Cold War amphibious warfare vessels of the United States
Ships built by Lockheed Shipbuilding and Construction Company
1967 ships